Selections from Road to Rio is a studio album of phonograph records by Bing Crosby and The Andrews Sisters released in 1948 featuring songs that were presented in the American comedy film Road to Rio.

Reception
Billboard reviewed it saying:
Two disk album featuring three novelty tunes and one ballad from the latest Crosby-Hope flicker, Road to Rio, is directly aimed at the film fan market, with release date timed to coincide with national showing of pic. Previously out as single platters, all four tunes enjoyed some success with Crosby's "But Beautiful" ballad easily taking top honors. Bing's "Language" with the Andrews Sisters will probably gain new popularity once public ganders gals and the groaner sell it on the screen.

Original track listing
These recently issued songs were featured on a 2-disc, 78 rpm album set, Decca Album No. A-629. Bing Crosby is on both discs and the Andrews Sisters are on Disc 1. All of the songs were written by Jimmy Van Heusen (music) and Johnny Burke (lyrics).

References

Bing Crosby albums
1948 albums
Decca Records albums
The Andrews Sisters albums